"L'école est finie" (English translation: "School is out") is a song by French singer Sheila. She released it in 1962, at the age of 16. Written, published and produced by young , the song sold over 1 million copies and effectively kick-started his career in the music business.

Lyrics 
The song reflected contempt for studying among young people.

Charts

References

External links 
 

1963 songs
1963 singles
Sheila (singer) songs
Songs written by Claude Carrère